"Glorious" is a song performed by German dance recording trio Cascada, written by Yann Peifer, Manuel Reuter, Andres Ballinas, Tony Cornelissen. The song was included on their compilation album The Best of Cascada (2013). It was announced that the song would be one of the candidate songs of the Unser Song für Malmö, the German national selection for the Eurovision Song Contest 2013. A preview of the song was published on 9 January 2013. The same day the full version was leaked.
The song represented Germany in the Eurovision Song Contest 2013. The song was released in Germany as a digital download on 8 February 2013.

Despite being one of the favorites to win it finished in 21st of 26 places with 18 points.

Media
On 14 February 2013 they performed the song live during Unser Song für Malmö. They performed the song live at the Eurovision Song Contest 2013 at the Malmö Arena, Malmö, Sweden on 18 May 2013.

Accusations of plagiarism
After "Glorious" was selected to represent Germany at the Eurovision Song Contest 2013, regional broadcaster, Norddeutscher Rundfunk (NDR), reported that it had "commissioned a musical audit", and that it would examine the claims that the song had plagiarised the Eurovision Song Contest 2012 winning song, "Euphoria" by Swedish artist Loreen.

Natalie Horler, lead singer of Cascada, told news agency Deutsche Presse-Agentur: "If you like, we can superimpose one song on the other. They are two different songs". Tina John, a phonetician quoted in the German newspaper Bild, that the two high-tempo tracks were noticeably similar, "The chorus uses the same accentuation, the ending peaks with the same combinations. The singers even use the same breathing methods".

NDR played down the accusations of plagiarism, with the head of entertainment at NDR, Thomas Schreiber saying "Every year, there are stories. Last year, Loreen's "Euphoria" was accused of being filched from David Guetta and Rihanna, claims that went nowhere".

Bild interviewed Thomas G:son and Peter Boström, the composers/producers of "Euphoria". G:son stated: "When the German authorities indeed believe that it might be plagiarism of one of our songs, they can investigate that. It's their right to do so. In general, pop songs are alike".

G:son was asked about going to court about the matter, G:son stated: "We definitely feel honoured. It's not plagiarism to us, however. If you look at the composition in a waveform, you will see that 10,000 pop songs have similar courses".

It was later announced on 25 February 2013, that the song was cleared of plagiarism and would represent Germany at the Eurovision Song Contest 2013. This conclusion was reached in an independent audit by music consultant Mathias Pogoda, who specializes in cases of musical plagiarism.

Music video
A music video to accompany the release of "Glorious" was first released on YouTube on 1 February 2013.

Track listing

Chart performance

Weekly charts

Release history

References

2013 singles
Cascada songs
Eurovision songs of 2013
Eurovision songs of Germany
2013 songs
Universal Music Group singles
Songs written by Andres Ballinas
Songs written by Tony Cornelissen
Songs involved in plagiarism controversies